Brenton Scott Rickard (born 19 October 1983) is a retired breaststroke swimmer from Australia. He emerged at the international level in 2006, swimming at the Commonwealth games. He has captured multiple Olympic and World Championship medals, as well as world and Commonwealth records. During this period he was coached by Vince Raleigh.

In 2009, he was Australian Institute of Sport Athlete of the Year.

Olympic Games

He arrived in Beijing as a medal contender and a serious threat for the gold medal in all three of his events. He set Australian, Commonwealth and Oceanic records, capturing silver medals in the 200-metre breaststroke and 4×100-metre medley relay, and finished 5th in the 100-metre breaststroke.
Beijing Olympics in Beijing, China:
 200-metre breaststroke.
 4×100-metre medley relay.
(5th) 100-metre breaststroke.

FINA World Championships

Rickard's first World Championships were a good one, consistently capturing medals in all of his pet events. No Australian records were set, however his status in the world rankings leapfrogged.
FINA World Championships 2007 in Melbourne, Australia:
 200-metre breaststroke.
 100-metre breaststroke.
 4×100-metre medley relay.

In the final of the 100-metre breaststroke, Rickard won the gold medal and surpassed the old world record of 58.91 held by Kosuke Kitajima with a time of 58.58.
FINA World Championships 2009 in Rome, Italy:
 100-metre breaststroke.
 4×100-metre medley relay.
(5th) 200-metre breaststroke.

Career best times

Doping Allegations

In 2020, the IOC began proceedings in the Court of Arbitration of Sport to void Rickard's results from the 2012 London Olympics after his urine samples from that competition tested positive for furosemide, a banned diuretic.  If the IOC's findings are upheld, six Australian swimmers would be stripped of their bronze medal in the  medley, in which Rickard swam the breaststroke leg of the heat.
The proceedings were withdrawn on August 24th, 2021.

See also

 List of world records in swimming
 List of Commonwealth records in swimming
 List of Olympic medalists in swimming (men)
 World record progression 100 metres breaststroke

References

External links

 

1983 births
Living people
Australian male breaststroke swimmers
Olympic silver medalists for Australia
Olympic bronze medalists for Australia
Olympic swimmers of Australia
Swimmers at the 2008 Summer Olympics
Swimmers at the 2012 Summer Olympics
Swimmers from Brisbane
Australian Institute of Sport swimmers
World record setters in swimming
Commonwealth Games gold medallists for Australia
Swimmers at the 2010 Commonwealth Games
Commonwealth Games bronze medallists for Australia
Commonwealth Games silver medallists for Australia
Olympic bronze medalists in swimming
World Aquatics Championships medalists in swimming
Medalists at the FINA World Swimming Championships (25 m)
Medalists at the 2012 Summer Olympics
Medalists at the 2008 Summer Olympics
Olympic silver medalists in swimming
Commonwealth Games medallists in swimming
21st-century Australian people
Medallists at the 2010 Commonwealth Games